Crystal Darkness is a 30-minute documentary film on the dangers and prevalence of the drug methamphetamine.  The film features testimonies of young people who have gone through meth addiction, as well as interviews with high-profile politicians and law enforcement officials.

The documentary is the centerpiece of a city-by-city, state-by-state campaign and has garnered the attention of residents in regions across the United States when it aired. In Arizona alone, the program reached an estimated 2.5 million residents and took over 1,200 phone calls from persons seeking help with meth addiction.

Production
The Crystal Darkness documentary was created and produced in Reno, Nevada in 2006 by Michael Reynolds. The campaign was directed and edited by Logan Needham. The entire program is produced by Global Studio.

A small portion of the film is pre-packaged with information on how meth affects the brain, how it's made, whom it affects and testimonials from law enforcement and individuals who have struggled through its addiction. The rest of the program is filmed in the host city or state with local experts, clinicians and providers, law enforcement, elected officials and recovering addicts.

Presentation
It is unique in that each city it airs, it is run as a media roadblock, wherein all the network stations in a target region air it simultaneously.<ref>{{Cite web|work=sacbee.com|url=http://www.sacbee.com/127/v-print/story/792842.html|publisher=Sacbee|title=Media Savvy: United against meth|access-date=2008-10-02|archive-url=https://web.archive.org/web/20080603083256/http://www.sacbee.com/127/v-print/story/792842.html|archive-date=2008-06-03|url-status=dead}}</ref> The program also airs in Spanish on Spanish-language stations.

The documentary features original music by alldaydrive and Today Is The Day NV. Both groups are based in Reno, Nevada.

Childhelp sponsorship
The program is sponsored by Childhelp, a national child abuse prevention and treatment non-profit organization. Childhelp is responsible for maintaining the program’s hot line, 1-888-METH-AID, in addition to its child abuse hot line, 1-800-4-A-CHILD. The non-profit organization reports over two-thirds of the cases of child abuse it handles have a direct correlation to meth use or production by the child’s parents or guardian.

Campaigns

The campaign has reached a large audience wherever it is deployed because of how it is managed. Prior to agreeing to be a host city or state, representatives interested in bringing the program to their community are invited to attend a dinner event the night the program airs in another location. There, they learn from individuals who have run a past campaign what is involved, how the program operates and how they achieved success. Each host city is responsible for pitching the local media to run the program in a media roadblock, where all stations in the region agree to air the program at a certain time and date. The program is a collaboration of effort among religious organizations, law enforcement, elected officials, volunteers, treatment providers, educators, and more. Each is delegated responsibilities ranging from community outreach to compiling a comprehensive provider resource book. Listed below are the regions the campaign has aired in to-date and cities that have campaigns in motion.

2007
Reno, NV
Las Vegas, NV
Oregon
San Diego, CA

2008
Sacramento, CA
El Paso, TX
Ciudad Juarez, Mexico
New Mexico
Arizona
Sonora, Mexico

2009
Arkansas
Central Valley, CA
Colorado
Oklahoma

Emmy Statuette
In October, 2008, the Arizona Broadcaster's Association received the Governor's Award from the Rocky Mountain Southwest Chapter of the National Academy of Television Arts & Sciences. The Emmy Statuette recognized the work of the Childhelp Crystal Darkness'' campaign in Arizona and its extensive community outreach. The Governor's Award is given annually to a deserving program and is the highest achievement the NATAS Chapter rewards.

Trivia
One of the recovering addicts featured in the film is Darrell Brooks, who would later kill six people and injure 62 others in the Waukesha Christmas parade attack.

References

External links 
Official Childhelp Crystal Darkness Website
Official Childhelp Website
 
Official alldaydrive band website
Official Today Is The Day NV website

Methamphetamine in the United States
2006 television films
2006 films
American documentary films
Substance dependence
2000s American films